
Horizon Adult Remand Centre opened in 2002 with a capacity of 1026.

It is operated by the Department of Correctional Services for the Ministry of National Security. The prison was featured in Vybz Kartel's music video for the song Conjugal Visit featuring Spice. This is possibly an allusion to his sentencing April 2014.

See also

List of prisons in Jamaica

External links
Aerial view.
Photos:

References

Prisons in Jamaica
Buildings and structures in Kingston, Jamaica